Copperopolis is a populated place situated in Yavapai County, Arizona, United States.

References

Further reading

External links
 Briggs or Kirby and Copperopolis – ghosttowns.com

Populated places in Yavapai County, Arizona
Ghost towns in Arizona
Cemeteries in Arizona